The Square Ring is a 1953 British tragi-comic drama, directed by Basil Dearden and made at Ealing Studios. It stars Jack Warner, Robert Beatty and Bill Owen. The film, based on a stage play by Ralph Peterson, centres on one night at a fairly seedy boxing venue and tells the disparate stories of the fighters and the women behind them.

Premise
Six stories that take place mainly in the locker room prior to and after various bouts during a single evening at a cheap boxing stadium: ex-champion Kid Curtis (the Docker Starkie role in the original play) attempting a comeback; Eddie Lloyd, a former amateur boxer making his professional debut; ‘Happy’ Burns a chirpy lightweight; Rick Martell, a crooked fighter planning to throw a fight; Whitey Johnson, a punch drunk ‘has-been’; and Rowdie Rawlings, a simple heavyweight. Danny Felton is the experienced ex-pro dressing room attendant.

Cast

Production
The play debuted in October 1952 and was immediately successful. Film rights were bought by Michael Balcon at Ealing. In November 1952 he announced John Mills would star, with Basil Dearden to direct and Michael Relph to produce. Relph later said he was reluctant to make the film as he felt box movies were bad box office.

Eventually Mills dropped out and was replaced by Canadian actor Robert Beatty. He had no boxing experience so he trained for two weeks with Dave Crowley in preparation for the role.

The play was all male but three women were added to the film. The women included Kay Kendall and Joan Collins, who were both under contract to Rank. Kendall had just made Genevieve but it had not been released. Collins appeared opposite then husband Maxwell Reed.

Reception
Critical reception was mixed. One review called the film "uneven", accusing it of "veering between comedy and tragedy".

References

External links 
 
The Square Ring at TCMDB
The Square Ring at Reel Streets

1953 films
1953 drama films
British sports drama films
British boxing films
Ealing Studios films
Films directed by Basil Dearden
Films set in England
British films based on plays
1950s sports drama films
British black-and-white films
1950s English-language films
1950s British films